Pengiran Muhammad Mu'izzuddin bin Pengiran Ismail (born 10 February 1987) is a Bruneian international footballer who plays for MS PPDB of the Brunei Super League as a goalkeeper. Prior to signing for DPMM, he played for Menglait FC and also the Royal Brunei Police Force Sports Council while working as an auxiliary police officer.

Mu'izzuddin has scored two league goals, one for each of his two previous clubs, via penalty kicks. He joined Brunei's only professional club DPMM FC in early 2017, providing competition for Wardun Yussof and Alizanda Sitom. He made 19 appearances in all competitions, profiting from Wardun's uncharacteristic injury layoffs.

Mu'izzuddin is also a member of the Brunei national football team, earning his first callup in March 2015. He gained his first international cap against Cambodia on 3 November 2015, conceding 3 goals in each half in a 6–1 loss. He was the reserve goalkeeper at the 2016 AFF Suzuki Cup qualification matches held in Cambodia. He played a similar role at the 2022 World Cup qualification matches against Mongolia in June 2019.

References

External links

1987 births
Living people
Association football goalkeepers
Bruneian footballers
Brunei international footballers
DPMM FC players